Shijiaying Township is a township located in northwestern Fangshan District, Beijing, China. It borders Zhaitang Town in its north, Da'anshan and Fozizhuang Townships in its east, Xiayunling Townships in its south, and Qingshui Town in its west. According to the 2020 census, its population was 3,364.

History

Administrative Divisions 

At the end of 2021, Shijiaying Township administered 12 villages within its boundaries:

Gallery

See also 
 List of township-level divisions of Beijing

References 

Fangshan District
Township-level divisions of Beijing